Following is a list of dams and reservoirs in Missouri.

All major dams are linked below.

Dams and reservoirs in Missouri

This list is incomplete.  You can help Wikipedia by expanding it.

Bagnell Dam, Lake of the Ozarks, AmerenUE
Bull Shoals Lake (extending north from Arkansas), United States Army Corps of Engineers
Clarence Cannon Dam, Mark Twain Lake, USACE
Clearwater Dam, Clearwater Lake, USACE
Fellows Lake Dam, Fellows Lake, City of Springfield, Missouri
Lock and Dam No. 20, Mississippi River, USACE
Lock and Dam No. 21, Mississippi River, USACE
Lock and Dam No. 22, Mississippi River, USACE
Lock and Dam No. 24, Mississippi River, USACE
Lock and Dam No. 25, Mississippi River, USACE
Lock and Dam No. 26 (historical), Mississippi River, USACE
Long Branch Dam, Long Branch Lake, USACE
Melvin Price Locks and Dam, Mississippi River, USACE
Pomme de Terre Dam, Pomme de Terre Lake, USACE
Powersite Dam, Lake Taneycomo, Empire District Electric Company
Smithville Dam, Smithville Lake, USACE
Stockton Dam, Stockton Lake, USACE
Table Rock Dam, Table Rock Lake, USACE
Harry S. Truman Dam, Truman Reservoir, USACE
Wappapello Dam, Lake Wappapello, USACE

References 

Missouri
Dams
Dams